Kyung Hee Astronomical Observatory  is an astronomical observatory owned and operated by Kyung Hee University.  It is located in Giheung-gu, Yongin, South Korea.  It was the first observatory in the nation to discover a variable star, later named the Kyung Hee Star.

External links
Kyung Hee Astronomical Observatory

Astronomical observatories in South Korea
Astronomical